Playhour was a British children's comics magazine published by Amalgamated Press/Fleetway/IPC between 16 October 1954 and 15 August 1987, a run of approximately 1,700 weekly issues. Playhour contained a mixture of original tales for young children and adaptations of well-known fairy tales (drawn by Nadir Quinto, Ron Embleton, Jesus Blasco and others).

Publication history
Originally published under the title Playhour Pictures, it was intended as a companion to Jack and Jill, initially aimed at a slightly older audience. The lead strip in its early days was Prince, the Wonder Dog of the Golden West, drawn by Sep E. Scott. 

With issue #32 (21 May 1955), the title of the publication was shortened to Playhour and it lowered its target age-group, introducing comic strips based on A. A. Milne's Winnie-the-Pooh and Kenneth Grahame's The Wind in the Willows, both drawn by Peter Woolcock.

1956 saw the arrival of Sonny and Sally of Happy Valley, two children (and their pet lamb) who were to be associated with the title until its demise in 1987. The stories of Sonny and Sally (drawn by Hugh McNeill) were initially related in rhyming couplets, as were a number of other early stories, although by the end of the 1970s the stories were written in normal prose form. (Others were told in captions below the illustration, or text comics, as Playhour avoided the use of word balloons.) Sonny and Sally "wrote" the weekly editorial letter and children writing to the publisher's editorial address (Cosy Corner, The Fleetway House, Farringdon Street, London E.C.4) would receive replies "signed" by Sonny and Sally.

Mergers 

It was standard practice in the twentieth-century British comics industry to merge a comic into another one when it declined in sales. Typically, three stories or strips from the canceled comic would continue for a while in the surviving comic, and both titles would appear on the cover (one in a smaller font than the other) until the title of the canceled comic was eventually dropped. Playhour exemplified this practice, with nine other publications merging into it over the course of its existence:

 15 March 1957 — merged with Chicks' Own (1920 series)
 31 January 1959 — merged with Tiny Tots (1927 series)
 11 April 1964 — merged with Harold Hare (1959 series)
 2 March 1968 — merged with TV Toyland (1966 series)
 1 February  1969 — merged with Robin (1953 series)
 22 September 1973 — merged with Hey Diddle Diddle and Bobo Bunny (1972 series)
 17 May 1975 — merged with Bonnie (1974 series)
 13 March 1982 — merged with Fun To Do (1978 series)
 6 August 1983 — merged with Chips Comic (1983 series)

Series published in Playhour
 Billy Brock's Schooldays
 Bunny Cuddles
 Jolly Days with Dicky and Dolly
The Dolly Girls
 Leo the Friendly Lion
 Little Red Squirrel
 The Magic Roundabout, based on the TV series
 The Merry Tales of Mimi and Marmy
 Mr Men, based on the children's book series
 Norman Gnome
 Num Num and His Funny Family
 Pinky and Perky, based on the TV series
 Prince, the Wonder Dog of the Golden West
 Sonny and Sally of Happy Valley
 Sooty, based on the TV series
 Tiger Tim and the Bruin Boys
 Tommy Trouble
 The Travels of Gulliver Guinea-Pig
 Wink and Blink, the Playful Puppies
 The Wonderful Tales of Willow Wood

References

Sources 

 
 

Playhour
Playhour
1954 comics debuts
1987 comics endings
Magazines established in 1954
Magazines disestablished in 1987
Defunct British comics
Playhour
Text comics